Ray Hutchison may refer to:

 Ray Hutchison (attorney) (1932–2014), American former attorney
 Ray Hutchison (cricketer) (born 1944), New Zealand former cricketer